The Crybaby is the twelfth studio album by American rock band the Melvins, released in 2000 through Ipecac Recordings. It is the last part of a trilogy preceded by The Maggot and The Bootlicker. The trilogy was later released on vinyl by Ipecac Recordings (The Trilogy Vinyl, November 27, 2000), although the song "Divorced" was edited down and the last four tracks were excluded.

Track listing

Personnel
King Buzzo – guitar (1–3, 5–11), bass (1), noise (4)
Dale Crover – drums (1, 3, 5–11), Mattel drums & guitar (2), noise (4), vocals (9)
Kevin Rutmanis – bass (2–11), slide bass (2 & 8); oscillator, harmonica, metronome, voice, guitar & engineer (4); vocals (8)

Guests
Leif Garrett – vocals (1)
David Yow – vocals (2 & 8)
Hank Williams III – guitar (3), vocals (3 & 9)
Henry Bogdan – steel guitar (3 & 9)
Mike Patton – vocals, sampler, guitar, percussion & engineer (4)
J. G. Thirlwell – vocals, samples, engineer & mixing (5)
Erik Sanko – guitar & vocals (6)
Rick Lee – trash & samples (6)
Amanda Ferguson – vocals (6)
Bruce Bromberg – guitar (6)
Tool – producer (7)
Godzik Pink – "Interlude" (8)
Bliss Blood – vocals, Wurlitzer treated vocal, electric sitar, musical saws & Señor Wences samples (10)
Kevin Sharp – vocals & samples (11)

Additional personnel
Tim Green – producer, engineer (1 [drums only], 4 & 5), mixing (6)
Billy Howerdel – mixing (1), guitar & bass engineer (1)
Roderick Kohn – engineer (6)
Vince DeFranco – producer (7)
Ryeland Allison – producer (7)
Sir David Scott Stone – engineer (8 ["Interlude"])
Kurt Wolf – engineer (10)
Mackie Osborne – art

References

Melvins albums
2000 albums
Ipecac Recordings albums
Sludge metal albums